Nasser Ibrahim Al-Nasr (Arabic:ناصر إبراهيم النصر) (born 11 July 1995) is a Qatari footballer. He currently plays for Umm Salal.

References

External links
 

1995 births
Living people
Qatari footballers
Qatari expatriate footballers
Aspire Academy (Qatar) players
Al Sadd SC players
Umm Salal SC players
Muaither SC players
Al-Markhiya SC players
Qatar SC players
Al Kharaitiyat SC players
Al-Shamal SC players
Qatar Stars League players
Association football midfielders
Footballers at the 2018 Asian Games
Asian Games competitors for Qatar
Expatriate footballers in Spain
Qatari expatriate sportspeople in Spain